Kerry Blair is an American author.

Biography
Blair currently resides in Mesa, Arizona.  She has had multiple sclerosis for many years and is a cancer survivor.  She is a member of the Church of Jesus Christ of Latter-day Saints.  She is a long-time member of and teacher with ANWA (the American Night Writers Association).

Blair is the author of eight novels and one non-fiction book in the LDS fiction market.

Bibliography

Novels
The Heart Has its Reasons (1999) 
The Heart Has Forever (2000) 
The Heart Only Knows (2001) 
Closing in (2002) 
Digging up the Past (2003) 
This Just In (2004) 
Mummy's the Word (2005) 
Ghost of a Chance (2007)

Nonfiction
Counting Blessings: Wit and Wisdom for Women (2008)

Recognition
In 2008, Blair received a Lifetime Achievement award from the Whitney Awards.  Although she had been a member of the Whitney Awards Committee for two years, the other members of the committee claim they "went behind her back" to name her the winner.

References

External links
http://kerryblair.com/
 

Latter Day Saints from Arizona
20th-century American novelists
Living people
21st-century American novelists
American women novelists
Novelists from Arizona
20th-century American women writers
21st-century American women writers
American women non-fiction writers
20th-century American non-fiction writers
21st-century American non-fiction writers
Year of birth missing (living people)